South Gloucestershire, also known as Gloucestershire South, was a parliamentary constituency in Gloucestershire.  It returned one Member of Parliament (MP)  to the House of Commons of the Parliament of the United Kingdom.

The constituency was created for the 1950 general election, and abolished for the 1983 general election.  It had three different sets of boundaries during its existence, and elected a new MP on each one of those occasions.

Boundaries

1950–1955: The Urban Districts of Kingswood and Mangotsfield, and the Rural Districts of Sodbury and Warmley.
   
1955–1974: The Rural Districts of Sodbury, Thornbury, and Warmley. Thornbury Rural District was added to the seat from the abolished Stroud and Thornbury constituency.
   
1974–1983: The Rural Districts of Sodbury and Thornbury. Warmley Rural District was transferred to the new Kingswood constituency.

Predecessor and successor constituencies
From 1885 to 1950 much of the area of the constituency was represented by the Thornbury constituency, and from 1950 to 1955 by Stroud and Thornbury.

When the constituency was abolished in 1983, 80.54% of it was transferred to the new constituency of Northavon, 14.75% to the redrawn Bristol North West and 4.70% to the redrawn Stroud.

Members of Parliament

Elections

Elections in the 1970s

Elections in the 1960s

Elections in the 1950s

References

Parliamentary constituencies in South West England (historic)
Constituencies of the Parliament of the United Kingdom established in 1950
Constituencies of the Parliament of the United Kingdom disestablished in 1983
South Gloucestershire District
Politics of South Gloucestershire District